Thomas Harold Flower (born 3 December 1957) is a former Australian rules footballer who played with Melbourne in the Victorian Football League (VFL). 

He is the younger brother of former Melbourne captain and Australian Football Hall of Fame inductee Robert Flower.

Notes

External links 

1957 births
Living people
Australian rules footballers from Victoria (Australia)
Melbourne Football Club players